FM10 may refer to:
 Nikon FM10, a camera
 Farm to Market Road 10, in Texas
 Football Manager 2010, a video game
 Volvo FM10, a heavy truck